Desalegn is an Ethiopian surname that may refer to
Betlhem Desalegn (born 1991), Ethiopian-born Emirati middle-distance runner
Hailemariam Desalegn (born 1965), Ethiopian politician
Temesgen Desalegn, Ethiopian journalist

Amharic-language names